Igor Fokin (June 14, 1960 – September 21, 1996) was a Russian puppeteer and street performer.  He learned his craft in his hometown of St. Petersburg.  He moved from the former Soviet Union to Cambridge, Massachusetts, in the United States, in 1993.  He was able to bring his wife and son over in 1994, and was also granted a visa which allowed him to continue to live and perform in the United States.  He performed puppet shows on summer evenings on street corners in Cambridge.  He used wooden marionettes set to traditional Russian music.  The marionettes were carved and painted by him, and he also sewed the marionettes' clothing.  In 1996, he performed shows as part of the festivities at the Summer Olympics in Atlanta,  Georgia.  He died early in the morning from heart failure on September 21, 1996, at the age of 36, just a few hours after returning home from a show in Harvard Square.

Soon after word of his death spread, several fund raisers were held for his family by area street performers and members of the local community.  On September 22, 2001, five years and one day after his death, a sculpture by Russian sculptor Konstantin Simun, modeled after one of his marionettes, was erected in his memory on the street corner in Brattle Square where he performed.

External links
 Tribute Site
  The Story of Fenist.  Award-winning documentary about Igor Fokin in English & Russian with English subtitles
  Official Fokin family website
  - film about Igor Fokin

1960 births
1996 deaths
Entertainers from Saint Petersburg
Russian buskers
Russian puppeteers
Harvard Square
20th-century Russian musicians
Russian emigrants to the United States